Wulipai Subdistrict is a subdistrict and the seat of Yueyanglou District in Yueyang Prefecture-level City, Hunan, China. It was originally a subdistrict in South District of Yueyang and formed in 1984. On March 16, 1996, the South District ceased as a district, it was merged to the newly established Yueyanglou District. The subdistrict has nine communities under its jurisdiction, its seat is Wulipai Community.

Administrative divisions

References

Yueyanglou District
Subdistricts of Hunan
County seats in Hunan